The following is a timeline of the history of Aguascalientes City, Mexico.

Prior to 20th century

 1575 - Aguascalientes founded.
 1604 - San Marcos Fair begins.
 1857 - Town becomes capital of Aguascalientes state.
 1867 - School of Agriculture established.
 1870 - El Despertador newspaper in publication.
 1883 - León-Aguascalientes railway established.
 1885 - Teatro Morelos opens.
 1899 - Catholic Diocese of Aguas Calientes established.

20th century

 1903 - State Teaching School built.
 1911 - Population: 44,800.
 1964 - Museo de la Insurgencia opens.
 1972 - Posada Museum opens.
 1973 - Autonomous University of Aguascalientes established.
 1975 - Rieleros de Aguascalientes baseball team formed.
 1982 - Aguascalientes State Historical Archive established.
 1987 - El Heraldo de Aguascalientes newspaper begins publication.
 1988 - Museo Regional de Historia de Aguascalientes established.
 1989 -  (garden) active.
 1991 - Teatro Aguascalientes opens.
 2000 - Population: 594,092.

21st century

 2003
 Estadio Victoria (stadium) opens.
 Club Necaxa football team active.
 2010 - Population: 722,250; metro 932,369.
 2011
 Lorena Martínez Rodríguez becomes mayor.
 Línea Verde project begins.
 Nuestra Belleza Aguascalientes 2011 (beauty pageant) held in city.
 2013 - New Nissan Motor Company manufactory begins operating.

See also
 Aguascalientes City history
 List of mayors of Aguascalientes
 Aguascalientes (state) history

References

Bibliography

in English
Published in the 19th century
 
 
 
 

Published in the 20th century
 
 
 
 
 
  (fulltext via OpenLibrary)
 
  (fulltext via OpenLibrary)

in Spanish

External links

  
 Digital Public Library of America. Items related to Aguascalientes, various dates

 
Aguascalientes
Aguascalientes City